The 2 Live Crew Is What We Are is the debut studio album by hip-hop group the 2 Live Crew. It was released in 1986 on Luke Records to a great deal of controversy and promptly was certified gold by the RIAA. It includes the hits "We Want Some Pussy", "Throw the 'D'", and "Cuttin' It Up". Bob Rosenberg, a south Florida DJ who would later form the dance-pop group Will to Power, remixed and edited the song "Beat Box". In Florida, it was deemed obscene, and one store clerk was charged with felony "corruption of a minor" for selling it to a 14-year-old girl. The clerk was later acquitted.

The following year, the album reached number 24 on the Billboard Top R&B/Hip-Hop Albums chart and number 128 on the Billboard 200.

Track listing

Notes
 Track 1 contains samples from "Do It, Do It" by Disco Four (1981), "(Nothing Serious) Just Buggin'" by Whistle (1986), "Rapp Will Never Die" by MC Shy D (1985), and "Flick of the Switch" by AC/DC (1983)
 Track 3 contains samples from "Got to Be Real" by Cheryl Lynn (1978), and "Bass Machine" by T La Rock (1986)
 Track 4 contains samples from "Dance to the Drummer's Beat" by Herman Kelly & Life (1978), "Slack Jawed Leroy" by Skillet & Leroy and LaWanda Page (1972), "Hip Hop, Be Bop (Don't Stop)" by Man Parrish (1982), "Bongo Rock '73" by Incredible Bongo Band (1973), and dialogue from Dolemite
 Track 5 contains samples from "Dance to the Drummer's Beat" by Herman Kelly & Life (1978), "Bonus (A Side)" by Hashim (1983), "Change the Beat (Female Version)" by Beside (1982), and "Planet Rock" by Afrika Bambaataa & Soulsonic Force (1982)
 Track 6 contains samples from "Take Me to the Mardi Gras" by Bob James (1975), "It's a New Day So Let a Man Come in and Do the Popcorn" by James Brown (1971), "Release Yourself" by Aleem (1984), "AJ Scratch" by Kurtis Blow (1984), "Say What?" by Trouble Funk (1983), "You'll Like It Too" by Funkadelic (1981), "Jam on the Groove" by Ralph MacDonald (1976), "Planet Rock" by Afrika Bambaataa & Soulsonic Force (1982), and "Rock Box" by Run-DMC (1984)
 Track 7 contains samples from "Catch a Groove" by Juice (1976)
 Track 8 contains samples from "Apache" by Incredible Bongo Band (1973), "Change the Beat (Female Version)" by Beside (1982), "Theme From the Black Hole" by Parliament (1979), "Mirda Rock" by Reggie Griffin & Technofunk (1982), "Triple Threat" by Z-3 MC's (1985), "Bonus Lesson #1 - No Music (The Original Human Beat Box)" by Doug E. Fresh (1984), "Planet Rock" by Afrika Bambaataa & Soulsonic Force (1982), "Cavern" by Liquid Liquid (1983), "Buffalo Gals" by Malcolm McLaren (1982), "It's Yours" by T La Rock & Jazzy Jay (1984), "Spoonin' Rap" by Spoonie Gee (1979), "Al-Naafiysh (The Soul) (B-Side)" by Hashim (1983), and "Hold It Now, Hit It" by Beastie Boys (1986)

Personnel 
 Luther Campbell - performer, producer, executive producer, A&R
 Brother Marquis - performer, producer
 Fresh Kid Ice - performer, producer
 Mr. Mixx - performer, producer
 Bruce Greenspan - recording & mixing
 Mark Boccaccio - recording & mixing
 Manny Morell - artwork & design
 Bob Rosenberg - editor (track 7)

References

External links

1986 debut albums
2 Live Crew albums
Luke Records albums